Quiévrechain is a commune in the Nord department in northern France.

Opposite is its Belgian sister town of Quiévrain.

Population

See also
Communes of the Nord department

References

Communes of Nord (French department)
Belgium–France border crossings